Winston Bakboord (born 24 December 1971) is a Dutch former professional footballer who made his Eerste Divisie league debut during the 1992–1993 season with club SBV Excelsior.

Club career
Bakboord also played for clubs VVV-Venlo, Helmond Sport and RBC Roosendaal, whom he left in 2002. He played as a defender.

References

External links
voetbal international profile

1971 births
Living people
Footballers from Rotterdam
Association football defenders
Dutch footballers
Excelsior Rotterdam players
VVV-Venlo players
Helmond Sport players
RBC Roosendaal players
Eredivisie players
Eerste Divisie players
VV Spijkenisse players